Marcus Bateman (born 16 September 1982) is a British rower. Bateman was born on Bermuda and learnt to row at the University of Bath.

References

External links 

 

1982 births
Living people
English male rowers
Members of Leander Club
Alumni of the University of Bath
World Rowing Championships medalists for Great Britain
Team Bath athletes